Metavisual Tachiste Abstract was a pivotal exhibition mounted by the Redfern Gallery, London in 1957. Subtitled 'Painting in England Today', Metavisual Tachiste Abstract ran from 4 April 1957 - 4 May 1957 . The exhibition was composed almost exclusively of works painterly abstraction and many of the leading British artists of the day exhibited works - including Peter Lanyon, Patrick Heron, Ben Nicholson, Roger Hilton, Robyn Denny, Alan Davie, Terry Frost, Sandra Blow and Gillian Ayres.

The title for the exhibition was suggested by Delia Heron and the exhibition was elected by Rex Nan Kivell and Harry Tatlock Miller (advised by Patrick Heron), partly from artists associated with the Redfern Gallery but also on a more inclusive basis, since their aim was to present the broadest range of works that fulfilled the criteria of the title.

In June 1957 the exhibition travelled, as 'Peinture Anglaise Contemporain', to the Musée des Beaux Arts, Liege where it was augmented with work by Francis Bacon, Graham Sutherland and Ivon Hitchens.

Artists in the exhibition (listed in order of catalogue)

References
 Sutton, Denys ed. (1957) Metavisual Tachiste Abstract-Painting in England Today. exh. cat. Redfern Gallery, London

External links
Redfern Gallery

20th-century English painters